Hotel Kazakhstan is the third-tallest building in the city of Almaty, Kazakhstan. It is 102 m (335 ft) tall, with 26 floors. It is situated in the southern center of Almaty. It is located on Dostyq Avenue, a major road in the east part of the city which runs all the way from Medeo to Panfilov Park, in the north part of town.

The total area is 44887.5 sq. meters.

The building was erected in 1977. It is constructed to stand an earthquake that measures 9.0 on the Richter scale. It is a famous landmark all over Almaty, and serves as a symbol of the city. It is also the eighth-tallest building in all Kazakhstan.

In October 2018, architectural lighting was installed on the hotel building.

The "Friendship" public garden adjoins the hotel territory, where the Camels panel, a monument to Shamshi Kaldayakov and a fountain are located. Convenient access to the embankment of the Malaya Almatinka River has been arranged.

Architecture 
The building is a unique construction, built in a zone of 9-point seismic activity. The 25-story, ellipse-shaped volume. The central entrance is accentuated by a curvilinear canopy of large overhang with illumination. The vertical row of bay windows, which gives the building lightness and openwork, ends with a high attic in the form of a golden crown. The constructive basis of the building is a monolithic reinforced concrete core with transverse reinforced concrete diaphragms.

In the hotel lobby, a 34-meter tapestry "The Rainbow of Kazakhstan" has hung since the hotel's opening day. This tapestry was created by a group of authors B. Zaurbekova, I. Yarema, E. Nikolaeva and K. Tynybekov. In 1980 the group of authors of the tapestry "Rainbow of Kazakhstan" was awarded the State Prize of the Kazakh SSR named after Ch. Valikhanov.

Marble, granite, shell rock, and other materials were used in finishing and decorating the facades and interiors.

Gallery

Monument status 
On April 4, 1979 the decision of the executive committee of the Almaty city council of people's deputies #139 "On approval of the list of historical and cultural monuments of Alma-Ata" was passed, in which the hotel building was indicated.

References

External links
 Official website of Hotel Kazakhstan
 Hotel Kazakhstan in Almaty

Hotels in Kazakhstan
Buildings and structures in Almaty
Buildings and structures completed in 1977
Hotel buildings completed in 1977
Hotels established in 1977
Hotels in Almaty
Hotels built in the Soviet Union